Julian Stockwin MBE (born 1944 in  Basingstoke, Hampshire, England) is an author of historical action-adventure fiction. As well as the Kydd Series he has written two standalone novels The Silk Tree and The Powder of Death.

Biography

Born in 1944, Stockwin soon developed a love for the sea, having an uncle, Tom Clay, who was a seaman in square-rigged ships and had sailed around Cape Horn in the Cutty Sark.

After grammar school, his father sent him to sea-training school at Indefatigable at age 14. He joined the Royal Navy at 15 and transferred to the Royal Australian Navy when his family emigrated. Stockwin served eight years, and was eventually rated petty officer.

Stockwin attended the University of Tasmania to read Far Eastern studies and psychology. He did post-graduate work in cross-cultural psychology. He got involved in the manufacture and design of computers and software development. Returning to the navy and the Royal Navy Reserve, Stockwin was honoured with an MBE. and retired as lieutenant commander.

He returned to the United Kingdom in 1990 and started to write in 1996. He currently resides in Ivybridge, Devon.

Works

Thomas Kydd series

Other historical fiction
The Silk Tree  (2014)  A fictional account of the bringing silkworm eggs to the Byzantine Empire from China.
The Powder of Death (2016) A fictional account of how gunpowder came to England and its use in cannons.

Non-fiction works
Stockwin's Maritime Miscellany (2009)

Footnotes

External links
 Julian Stockwin's Official Web Site
 Julian Stockwin on Twitter
 Interview with Julian Stockwin
 Julian Stockwin's Facebook Page
 Interview with Julian Stockwin (2010)

1944 births
Living people
21st-century British novelists
British historical novelists
Nautical historical novelists
People from Basingstoke
People from Ivybridge
British male novelists
21st-century British male writers